Icona Pop is the debut studio album by Swedish duo Icona Pop, released on 14 November 2012 by TEN Music Group and includes the multi-country top 10 hit single "I Love It". The album peaked at number 55 on the Swedish Albums Chart.

Singles
"Manners" was released as the lead single from the album on 15 February 2011. "I Love It" was released as the second single from the album on 9 May 2012. "We Got the World" was released as the third single from the album on 15 October 2012.

Track listing

Charts

Release history

References

2012 debut albums
Icona Pop albums
TEN Music Group albums
Synth-pop albums by Swedish artists
Dance music albums by Swedish artists